His Honour or Her Honour (American English: His Honor or Her Honor) is an honorific prefix traditionally applied to certain classes of people, in particular justices and judges and mayors. In Australia and the United States, the prefix is also used for magistrates (spelled in the American style, "Honor"). A corruption of the term, "Hizzoner", is sometimes used to irreverently refer to mayors of larger U.S. cities such as New York, Los Angeles, Chicago, or Philadelphia.

In Australia, His Honour or Her Honour is used as a title for the Administrator of the Northern Territory while in office. The Honourable is a courtesy title retained for life for a former administrator.

In England and Wales, it is used as a prefix for circuit judges, e.g. His Honour Judge John Smith. It is sometimes abbreviated in writing as HHJ.

In Hong Kong, which retained much of England's judicial tradition, it is also used as a prefix for district court judges.

In Northern Ireland the prefix is also used for county court judges.

In Canada, His Honour or Her Honour is used as a title for the lieutenant governor of a province while in office.  The spouse of a lieutenant governor is also addressed as His or Her Honour only while the lieutenant governor is in office.  The Honourable is a courtesy title retained for life for a former lieutenant governor.

Formerly, this style was sometimes used by an enlisted seaman when addressing the captain of a ship, though this practice has not been common since the early Nineteenth Century.

References 

Forms of Address – Department for Constitutional Affairs

Styles (forms of address)